Vozrozhdeniye is the first full-length album by the Russian folk metal band Arkona. It was released on 20 April 2004 through Sound Age Production. A re-recording of the album with different artwork was released by Napalm Records in 2015.

Track listing
 "Kolyada" (Carol) – 6:56
 "Maslenitsa" (Carnival) – 2:51	
 "K Domu Svaroga" (To the House of Svarog) – 5:21	
 "Chiornye Vorony" (Black Ravens) – 4:15	
 "Vozrozhdeniye" (Revival) – 6:05	
 "Rus'" – 6:34
 "Bratye Slavyane" (Brother Slavs) – 4:53	
 "Solntsevorot" (Solstice) – 3:37
 "Pod Mechami" (Under the Swords) – 5:12
 "Po Zverinym Tropam" (On Animals' Paths) – 3:37
 "Zalozhnyy" (Hostage) – 4:10	
 "Zov Predkov" (Call of the Ancestors) – 5:02

Original track listing (in Russian)
 "Коляда"
 "Масленица"
 "К дому Сварога"
 "Чёрные вороны"
 "Возрождение"
 "Русь"
 "Брате славяне"
 "Солнцеворот"
 "Под мечами..."
 "По звериным тропам..."
 "Заложный"
 "Зов предков"

Credits
 Maria Arkhipova – vocals, keyboards
 Alexei "Lesyar" Agafonov – vocals (tracks #3, 4, 9)
 Sergei "Lazar" – guitars
 Ruslan "Kniaz" – bass
 Vlad "Artist" – drums

References

2004 debut albums
Arkona (band) albums